The 2010 United States House of Representatives Elections in Florida were held on November 2, 2010 to determine who would represent the state of Florida in the United States House of Representatives. Representatives are elected for two-year terms; those elected served in the 112th Congress from January 2011 until January 2013. Florida had twenty-five seats in the House, apportioned according to the 2000 United States Census, but would soon gain two more congressional seats in 2012.

A large majority of the incumbents sought re-election on November 2, and only the 12th district and the  17th district were open races. Upon the resignation of Robert Wexler, a special election was held in April to determine the new representative of 19th district. The winner of that race was Ted Deutch of the Democratic Party, who sought re-election on November 2.

Overview 
Results of the 2010 United States House of Representatives elections in Florida by district:

Congressional districts

District 1

Republican incumbent Jeff Miller has represented this western Florida Panhandle congressional district since winning a special election in 2001. Jeff Miller sought re-election, and  won by a landslide against challenging Independents Joe Cantrell and John Krause. Miller was also challenged by Jim Bryan, a qualified write-in candidate. 
Race details
Race ranking and details from CQ Politics
Campaign Contributions from OpenSecrets
Race profile at The New York Times
Campaign websites
Jeff Miller for Congress 
Joe Cantrell for Congress
John Krause for Congress
Jim Bryan for Congress

Results

District 2*

Democratic incumbent Allen Boyd ran for reelection, facing Republican nominee businessman Steve Southerland. Independent candidates Paul C. McKain and Dianne Berryhill were also on the ballot, and Ray Netherwood qualified as a write-in candidate.

In addition, Green Party candidate Steve Wilkie did not qualify for the congressional election.

Boyd won the Democratic primary against State Senate Democratic Leader Alfred Lawson, Jr. Southerland won the Republican primary against Eddie Hendry, Ron McNeil, Barbara F. Olschner and David Scholl. Southerland went on to unseat Boyd in the general election following, among other issues, voter discontent with the incumbent for his support of the policies of the President.

The district, which includes Tallahassee, voted 54%–45% for John McCain in 2008. 
Race details
Race ranking and details from CQ Politics
Campaign Contributions from OpenSecrets
Race profile at The New York Times
Campaign websites
Allen Boyd for Congress
Steve Southerland for Congress
Paul McKain for Congress
Dianne Berryhill for Congress
Ray Netherwood for Congress
Steve Wilkie for Congress - did not qualify

Polling

Results

District 3

Democrat Corrine Brown represents this north central Florida district. She was challenged by Republican nominee Mike Yost and Independent Terry Martin-Back, who Corrine Brown defeated on November 2, 2010.

Race details
Race ranking and details from CQ Politics
Campaign Contributions from OpenSecrets
Race profile at The New York Times
Campaign websites
Corrine Brown for Congress
Mike Yost for Congress
Terry Martin-Back for Congress

Results

District 4

  
This Jacksonville district is represented by Republican Ander Crenshaw. Independent Troy Stanley challenged him. Gary L. Koniz and Deborah "Deb" Katz Pueschel also qualified as write-ins. Crenshaw won the race by a wide margin.
Race ranking and details from CQ Politics
Campaign Contributions from OpenSecrets
Race profile at The New York Times

Results

District 5

  
This was an open seat, as Republican incumbent Ginny Brown-Waite retired, citing health reasons.  Hernando County Sheriff Rich Nugent won the Republican primary to face Democratic businessman Jim Piccillo (campaign site, PVS, FEC), a former Republican and political novice. Nugent defeated Piccillo in the general election.
Race ranking and details from CQ Politics
Campaign Contributions from OpenSecrets
Race profile at The New York Times

Results

District 6

   
Republican incumbent Cliff Stearns has held this seat since 1989. He was challenged by Independent candidate Steve Schonberg (campaign site, PVS).

Stearns won against Don Browning (campaign site, PVS) in the Republican primary.

On October 19, 2009 the Florida Whig Party announced that John Annarumma would be their nominee, but he later dropped out.   Stearns won the general election with 71% of the vote.
Race ranking and details from CQ Politics
Campaign Contributions from OpenSecrets
Race profile at The New York Times

Results

District 7

Republican incumbent John Mica has held this district since 1993, and ran for re-election. He was challenged by Democratic nominee Palm Coast Navy veteran and nonprofit CEO Heather Beaven (campaign site, PVS, FEC).

Both Mica and Beaven ran unopposed in their respective primary elections. Peter Silva (campaign site) dropped out earlier. 2008 candidate Faye Armitage considered re-running, but decided against it.

Florida Whig Party candidate Stephen J. Bacon (campaign site) also ran. Mica was easily reelected.
Race ranking and details from CQ Politics
Campaign Contributions from OpenSecrets
Race profile at The New York Times

Results

District 8*

Democratic incumbent Alan Grayson was defeated by Republican nominee former State Senate Majority Leader and Speaker of the Florida House of Representatives Daniel Webster. TEA Party candidate Peg Dunmire (campaign site, PVS), and Independent George L. Metcalfe (campaign sitePVS were on the ballot, and Florida Whig Party Steven J. Gerritzen (campaign site), qualified as a write-in candidate.

Grayson ran unopposed in the Democratic primary. In the Republican primary, Webster defeated Ross Bieling; Dan Fanelli, a former pilot; State Representative Kurt Kelly; 2008 GOP candidate Todd Long; Bruce O'Donoghue, businessman; and Patricia Sullivan, GOP activist. 
Race ranking and details from CQ Politics
Campaign Contributions from OpenSecrets
Race profile at The New York Times

Polling

Results

District 9

Republican Gus Bilirakis ran for re-election, having first won election in 2007 to replace his father, Michael Bilirakis, who had served the previous 23 years. Anita dePalma (campaign site, PVS) defeated Phil Hindahl (campaign site, PVS) in the Democratic primary election. Bilirakis was reelected with 71% of the vote.
Race ranking and details from CQ Politics
Campaign Contributions from OpenSecrets
Race profile at The New York Times

Results

District 10

Republican incumbent Bill Young was challenged by Democratic nominee State Senator Charlie Justice. Martin Rokicki qualified to run as a write-in candidate.

Young, who has represented this district since 1971 and is currently the longest-serving Republican in the House, ran unopposed in the Republican primary, local tea party activist Eric Forcade having withdrawn. Justice also ran unopposed in the Democratic primary. Young was reelected to a 21st term.
Race ranking and details from CQ Politics
Campaign Contributions from OpenSecrets
Race profile at The New York Times

Results

District 11
 

Democratic incumbent Kathy Castor was challenged by Republican nominee Mike Prendergast (campaign site, PVS). Castor has held the seat since 2006. Castor was reelected with 60% of the vote.
Race ranking and details from CQ Politics
Campaign Contributions from OpenSecrets
Race profile at The New York Times

Results

District 12

This was an open seat as Republican incumbent Adam Putnam ran for Florida Commissioner of Agriculture. Democratic nominee Polk County Elections Supervisor Lori Edwards (campaign site, PVS), Republican nominee former State Representative Dennis Ross (campaign site, PVS), and Tea Party nominee Polk County Commissioner Randy Wilkinson (campaign site, PVS) were on the general election ballot.

Edwards won against retired United States Navy chief Doug Tudor (campaign site, PVS) in the Democratic primary. Ross won against John W. Lindsey, Jr. in the Republican primary. Wilkinson ran unopposed.

Ross won the general election with 48% of the vote; Edwards garnered 41%, and 11% of the voters chose Wilkinson.
Race ranking and details from CQ Politics
Campaign Contributions from OpenSecrets
Race profile at The New York Times

Polling

†Internal poll commissioned for Edwards campaign

Results

District 13

Republican incumbent Vern Buchanan successfully ran for reelection, challenged by Democratic nominee The Reverend James T. Golden (campaign site, PVS).

Buchanan won against Don Baldauf (campaign site, PVS) in the Republican primary. Golden won against Rick Eaton (campaign site, PVS) in the Democratic primary.
Race ranking and details from CQ Politics
Campaign Contributions from OpenSecrets
Race profile at The New York Times
Republican Primary Debate video

Results

District 14

Republican incumbent Connie Mack was challenged by Democratic nominee Jim Roach (campaign site, PVS) and Independent William Maverick Saint Claire (PVS). Mack was reelected in the general election.

In 2008, McCain won 57% of the vote. 
Race ranking and details from CQ Politics
Campaign Contributions from OpenSecrets
Race profile at The New York Times

Results

District 15

First term Republican incumbent Bill Posey was reelected, defeating Democratic nominee former NASA executive and public administrator Shannon Roberts (campaign site, PVS). Both ran unopposed in their respective primary elections.
Race ranking and details from CQ Politics
Campaign Contributions from OpenSecrets
Race profile at The New York Times

Results

District 16

First term Republican incumbent Tom Rooney ran for re-election, challenged by Democratic nominee Jim Horn (campaign site, PVS). William Dean has qualified as a write-in candidate. Rooney prevailed in the general election.

Rooney ran unopposed in the Republican primary. Horn won against Ed Tautiva (campaign site, PVS) in the Democratic primary. St. Lucie County Commissioner Christopher Craft dropped out on March 26, 2010.

Rooney's predecessor Tim Mahoney, and Mahoney's predecessor Mark Foley, were both involved in scandals. 
Race ranking and details from CQ Politics
Campaign Contributions from OpenSecrets
Race profile at The New York Times

Results

District 17

This was an open seat, as Democratic incumbent Kendrick Meek ran for the U.S. Senate. Democratic nominee State Senator Frederica Wilson ran against Independent attorney Roderick D. Vereen (campaign site, PVS).

Wilson won the Democratic primary, running against community activist and Executive Director of FANM (Haitian Women of Miami) Marleine Bastien (campaign site, PVS), former State Representative Phillip Brutus, State Representative James Bush III, North Miami Councilman Scott Galvin (campaign site, PVS), Miami Gardens Mayor Shirley Gibson (campaign site, PVS), physician Rudy Moise (campaign site, PVS), State Representative Yolly Roberson, and Miami Gardens City Councilman and attorney Andre Williams (campaign site, PVS). The Miami Herald newspaper endorsed Shirley Gibson in the Democratic primary.

Teacher Corey Poitier was the lone announced Republican candidate, but he dropped out.

Wilson won 86.2% of the vote in the general election.
Race ranking and details from CQ Politics
Campaign Contributions from OpenSecrets
Race profile at The New York Times
US House District 17: The candidates, Carrie Wells, The Miami Herald/South Florida Sun-Sentinel, August 9, 2010
9 Democrats seek Kendrick Meek's US House seat, Jennifer Kay/AP, The Miami Herald, August 19, 2010

Results

District 18

Republican incumbent Ileana Ros-Lehtinen had held this seat since 1989, and was challenged by Rolando A. Banciella (campaign site, PVS). Both ran unopposed in their respective primaries. Ros-Lehtinen won the general election.
Race ranking and details from CQ Politics
Campaign Contributions from OpenSecrets
Race profile at The New York Times

Results

District 19

Democrat Robert Wexler resigned on January 3, 2010, to become president of the Washington-based Center for Middle East Peace and Economic Cooperation. His seat was filled by Ted Deutch, the winner of a special election, held on April 13. Deutch faced Joe Budd (campaign site, PVS), running unopposed in the Republican primary, along with write-in candidate Stan Smilan (campaign site) in the General election. Deutsch was easily re-elected.
Race ranking and details from CQ Politics
Campaign Contributions from OpenSecrets
Race profile at The New York Times

Results

District 20

Incumbent Democrat Debbie Wasserman Schultz was challenged by Republican nominee businesswoman Karen Harrington (campaign site, PVS) of Davie. Independents Stanley Blumenthal (campaign site, PVS) and Bob Kunst (campaign site, PVS) were also running. Florida Whig Party candidate Clayton Schock (campaign site) ran as a write-in.  Wasserman Schultz was re-elected.

Wasserman Schultz ran unopposed in the Democratic primary. Harrington won against businessman Robert Lowry (campaign site, PVS) of Hollywood, and trans woman Donna Milo (campaign site, PVS). 
Race ranking and details from CQ Politics
Campaign Contributions from OpenSecrets
Race profile at The New York Times

Results

District 21

This district was an open election, as Republican incumbent Lincoln Diaz-Balart was retiring. His brother Mario Diaz-Balart, current Representative of the 25th District, ran unopposed for this seat on November 2, 2010.
Race ranking and details from CQ Politics
Campaign Contributions from OpenSecrets
Race profile at The New York Times

Results

District 22

Democratic incumbent Ron Klein was seeking re-election in this Palm Beach-Broward County district, and was challenged and defeated by Republican nominee Allen West, the former military officer whom Klein defeated 55-45 in 2008.

Klein defeated Paul Renneisen (campaign site, PVS) in the Democratic primary. West defeated David Brady (campaign site, PVS) in the Republican primary.
Race ranking and details from CQ Politics
Campaign Contributions from OpenSecrets
Race profile at The New York Times

Polling

†Internal poll (Wilson Research Strategies for West and Anzalone Research and Harstad Strategic Research for Klein)

Results

District 23

Democratic incumbent Alcee Hastings has held this seat since 1993 and ran for reelection. He was challenged by Republican nominee Bernard Sansaricq (campaign site, PVS). Both ran unopposed in their respective primary elections. Hastings was reelected by a wide margin.
Race ranking and details from CQ Politics
Campaign Contributions from OpenSecrets
Race profile at The New York Times

Results

District 24*

Democratic incumbent Suzanne Kosmas was challenged and defeated by Republican nominee Sandy Adams. Green Party nominee Nicholas Ruiz III, PhD., qualified as a write-in candidate.

Kosmas defeated former Winter Springs Mayor Paul Partyka in the Democratic primary. Adams defeated Karen Diebel, Tom Garcia, Deon Long and Craig Miller in the Republican primary.

Polling

†Internal poll for Kosmas campaign

Results

District 25

Republican incumbent Mario Diaz-Balart held this district since 2003 but on February 11, 2010 announced that he would not seek another term in the 25th district but would instead run for his brother's seat in the 21st District of Florida.  Republican nominee State Representative David Rivera, Democratic nominee Joe Garcia, Tea Party nominee Roly Arrojo (PVS), and Florida Whig Party nominee Craig Porter (campaign site, PVS) were running. Rivera prevailed in the general election.

Rivera defeated Mariana 'Marili' Cancio (campaign site, PVS) and Paul Crespo (campaign site, PVS) in the Republican primary. Garcia defeated Luis Meurice (campaign site, PVS) in the Democratic primary. Arrojo and Porter were unopposed in their respective primaries.
Race ranking and details from CQ Politics
Campaign Contributions from OpenSecrets
Race profile at The New York Times

Polling

†Internal poll for Garcia campaign

Results

Key 
* A district that has a PVI of a party that is represented by the opposite party, and applies to an EVEN score

References

External links
Florida Division of Elections
Candidate Listing for 2010 General Election
U.S. Congress Candidates for Florida at Project Vote Smart
Florida U.S. House from OurCampaigns.com
Campaign contributions for U.S. Congressional races in Florida from OpenSecrets
2010 Florida General Election graph of multiple polls from Pollster.com

House - Florida from the Cook Political Report

Voter's Guide at The Miami Herald
Voter Guide 2010 at the South Florida Sun-Sentinel

House
Florida
2010